The 11th Rhode Island Infantry Regiment was a unit of the Union Army during the American Civil War.

Service history
The 11th Rhode Island Infantry Regiment was organized at Providence, Rhode Island and mustered into service on October 1, 1862 for a term of service of nine months. It was initially commanded by Colonel Edwin Metcalf, then by Colonel Horatio Rogers Jr. and finally by George Earl Church for the remainder of its service.  

The regiment left Rhode Island for Washington, D.C. on October 6. Attached to Military District of Washington D.C. to December, 1862. District of Alexandria, Defences of Washington, and 22nd Army Corps, to April, 1863. 1st Brigade, 1st Division, 7th Army Corps, Department of Virginia, to June, 1863. 2nd Brigade, 1st Division, 4th Army Corps, Department of Virginia to July, 1863.

Duty at East Capitol Hill, Fort Ethan Allen and Miner's Hill, Defences of Washington, till January 14, 1863. Guard duty at Convalescent Camp till April 15. Moved to Norfolk, thence to Suffolk April 15–19. Siege of Suffolk April 19-May 4. Siege of Suffolk raised May 4. Expedition to destroy Norfolk & Petersburg Railroad and Seaboard & Roanoke Railroad May 16–27. Expedition to Blackwater June 12–18. Moved to Norfolk June 19, thence to Yorktown, and to Williamsburg June 22. Duty at Williamsburg till June 30. Left Yorktown for home July 2. Mustered out July 13, 1863.

Losses
The regiment lost 8 men by disease.

Commanding officers
Colonel Edwin Metcalf; October 1, 1862 to November 9th, 1862
Lieutenant Colonel J. Talbot Pittman (acting); November 10, 1862 to January 22, 1863
Colonel Horatio Rogers Jr.;  January 23rd, 1863 to March 19th, 1863
Colonel George E. Church; March 20th, 1863 to July 13, 1863

See also
 List of Rhode Island Civil War units

References

External links
 

Military units and formations established in 1862
Military units and formations disestablished in 1863
Units and formations of the Union Army from Rhode Island
1862 establishments in Rhode Island
1863 disestablishments in the United States